William Lacy Clay Sr (born April 30, 1931) is an American politician from Missouri.  As Congressman from Missouri's first district, he represented portions of St. Louis in the U.S. House of Representatives for 32 years.

Early life and family
Clay was born in St. Louis, Missouri, the son of Luella S. (Hyatt) and Irving Charles Clay. He graduated from Saint Louis University in 1953.  Clay served in the United States Army from 1953 to 1955, and he was a St. Louis alderman from 1959 to 1964. Clay served 105 days in jail for participating in a civil rights demonstration in 1963. Prior to entering Congress, Clay held jobs first as a real estate broker and later as a labor coordinator. He worked for the union of St. Louis city employees from 1961 to 1964 and then with a steamfitters union local until 1967.

Clay married Carol Ann Johnson in 1953. They had three children, including William Lacy Clay Jr., who would succeed his father in the U.S. House. The Clay family were parishioners at the predominantly Black St. Nicholas’ Catholic Church in St. Louis.

Politics

Clay was elected to the House of Representatives as a Democrat in 1968. He became an advocate for environmentalism, labor issues, and social justice. In 1993, Clay voted for the Family and Medical Leave Act. From 1991 until the Democrats lost control of Congress in 1995, Clay chaired the House Committee on the Post Office and Civil Service. In 2000, he retired from the House and his son, Lacy, succeeded him.

Honors
In 1996, the William L. Clay Center for Molecular Electronics (now the Center for Nanoscience) was dedicated in his honor on the campus of the University of Missouri-St. Louis.

Clay is also the founder of the William L. Clay Scholarship and Research Fund, which awards college scholarships to high school seniors living in Missouri's first congressional district. The Fund, which is a 501(c)3 organization, has awarded scholarships since 1985.

Poplar Street Bridge, which connects St. Louis, Missouri, and East St. Louis, Illinois, was renamed on October 7, 2013, Congressman William L. Clay Bridge.

William L. Clay has a star and biographical plaque on the St. Louis Walk of Fame.

Works
Clay has written several works of non-fiction.

To Kill or Not to Kill: Thoughts on Capital Punishment (1990) 
Just Permanent Interests: Black Americans in Congress, 1870–1991 (1992) 
Racism in the White House: A Common Practice of Most United States Presidents (2002) 
Bill Clay: A Political Voice at the Grass Roots (2004)  Designed by Steve Hartman of Creativille, Inc. Creativille, Inc. - Be Simple. Be Passionate. Be Creative.
The Jefferson Bank Confrontation (2008)

See also

List of African-American United States representatives

References

External links
Biographic sketch at U.S. Congress website
The History Makers
The William L. Clay Scholarship and Research Fund

|-

|-

1931 births
Living people
Activists from St. Louis
African-American members of the United States House of Representatives
African-American United States Army personnel
African-American people in Missouri politics
African-American Catholics
American trade unionists
Businesspeople from St. Louis
Democratic Party members of the United States House of Representatives from Missouri
Members of the St. Louis Board of Aldermen
Military personnel from Missouri
Politicians from St. Louis
Saint Louis University alumni
American civil rights activists
United States Army soldiers
Writers from St. Louis
21st-century African-American people
20th-century African-American people
Members of Congress who became lobbyists